Great Inheritance is a 2006 South Korean television drama starring Kim Jaewon and Han Ji-min. It aired on KBS2 from May 3 to June 29, 2006 on Wednesdays and Thursdays at 21:55 for 17 episodes.

Plot
Kang Hyun-se is a gangster of the Hanbando Group who inherits the Maru Kindergarten after his estranged mother dies from a heart attack. He intends to sell the kindergarten and comes to terrorize the staff, only to learn that his mother had stipulated that he has to work as kindergarten teacher for 100 days in order to gain legal ownership.

Meanwhile, a development firm called NK plans to buy the kindergarten's property and begin construction on a project named Rainbow Park, an amusement park for children. Rainbow Park is a dream project of one manager named Jung Il-do, who mentors a young graduate from America, manager Choi Shi-wan, who incidentally shares a past with Yoo Mi-rae, a dedicated and naive kindergarten teacher.

The Hanbando Group, headed by gangster boss So Dong-pa, convinces Hyun-se to fulfill his mother's conditions and then turn over the kindergarten to the gang's control once the 100-day period is completed. This would force NK into giving So Dong-pa a seat in its board of directors.

Hyun-se reluctantly endures teaching at the kindergarten, inevitably falling for Mi-rae and the lovable children. He also discovers the identity of his biological father.

Cast
Kim Jaewon - Kang Hyun-se
Han Ji-min - Yoo Mi-rae, teacher
Kim Ji-hoon - Choi Shi-wan
Lee Mi-sook - Go Ah-ra, kindergarten director
Jang Hyun-sung - Jung Man-ho, nutritionist/handyman
Byun Hee-bong - Jung Il-do, land developer
Son Byong-ho - So Dong-pa, gang boss
Jung Tae-woo - Nal-chi, Hyun-se's sidekick
Shin Dong-woo - Jin Kyung-ho, student
Yoo Yeon-mi - Han Ye-seo, student
Jin Ji-hee - Goo Dong-joo, student
Kim Min-ki - Hwant Seung-hyun, student
Choi Han-wool - Han-wool, teacher
Choi In-kyung - Chun-sa, teacher
Ha Joo-hee - Jin Yoo-jung, Kyung-ho's mother
Park Jae-rom - Ye-seo's mother
Kim Jin-soo - Goo Joon-ik, Dong-joo's father/policeman
Noh Hyun-hee - Seung-hyun's mother
Hwang Suk-kyu - Chun Sang-sik, gang member
Park Joo-ah - Ms. Kang, Hyun-se's mother

Ratings 
In the table below, the blue numbers represent the lowest ratings and the red numbers represent the highest ratings.

References

External links
 Great Inheritance official KBS website 
 

Korean Broadcasting System television dramas
2006 South Korean television series debuts
2006 South Korean television series endings
South Korean romance television series